The Lockley-Newport LN-27 is an American sailboat that was designed by Stuart Windley and Harry R. Sindle as a cruiser and first built in 1979.

The Lockley-Newport LN-27 design was developed into the Gloucester 27 in 1983.

Production
The design was built by Lockley Newport Boats in the United States, starting in 1979, but it is now out of production.

Design
The Lockley-Newport LN-27 is a recreational keelboat, built predominantly of fiberglass, with wood trim. It has a fractional sloop or optional masthead sloop rig, a raked stem, a reverse transom, an internally mounted spade-type rudder controlled by a tiller and a fixed fin keel. It displaces  and carries  of ballast.

The design has sleeping accommodation for five or six people, with a double "V"-berth in the bow cabin, a straight settee berth that is an optional double in the main cabin and an aft cabin with a double berth on the port side. The galley is located on the starboard side just forward of the companionway ladder. The galley is "U"-shaped and is equipped with a two-burner stove, an icebox and a sink. The head is located just aft of the bow cabin.

See also
List of sailing boat types

Related development
Gloucester 27

References

Keelboats
1970s sailboat type designs
Sailing yachts
Sailboat type designs by Stuart Windley
Sailboat type designs by Harry R. Sindle
Sailboat types built by Lockley Newport Boats